West Visayas State University, Pototan is in Pototan, Iloilo, Philippines, has evolved from a high school and in 2000 became one of four satellite universities in the Third Congressional District of Iloilo of the West Visayas State University system (WVSU).

History
The history, growth and development of the university can be traced back to the post-war refresher classes under the umbrella of Iloilo High School in 1945.   The name then evolved  from Pototan Regional High School (Iloilo Branch), to Iloilo Provincial High School in 1946 and,  Pototan High School  from 1947 to 1957.

From the NARIC building where classes were originally held, it moved to a 20-room nipa building at the town plaza and finally transferred to its present site at Barangay Cau-ayan, Pototan.  Of the 11.5-hectare school site, 9.5 hectares were donated by some civic spirited Pototanons and another 2 hectares were purchased by the school..

On June 22, 1957,  Pototan High School was converted to Pototan Vocational School by virtue of R.A. 1924.  For 26 years, this school had been the training ground for technical-vocational education.

On June 24, 1983, it was converted into Pototan College of Arts and Sciences. Degree programs in education were added to the trade-technical courses. More buildings and classrooms were built and additional facilities were acquired.

On January 29, 1999, pursuant to Special Provision NO. 9 of R.A. 8760 Pototan College of Arts and Sciences was integrated to West Visayas State University, Iloilo City. This integration became operational on August 22, 2000, through  the issuance of CHED Memorandum Order  27, s. 2000.  The school is then called West Visayas State University-Pototan Campus.

As part of the university system, this campus has offered additional degree programs in line with teacher education, industrial, information, business and management technology. The present administration has introduced many changes on the physical aspects as seen in the new structures that have risen and the renovated buildings, acquired equipment and improved facilities to cater to the needs of this knowledge society.

Her existence for six decades in the community has created a niche in the field of education and training in this central part of the province. At 60, WVSU in Pototan aspires to be the most admired external campus as it performs its role and functions as an autonomous unit in the university system whose vision is to be one of the top ten universities in Southeast Asia by 2010.

The history, growth and development of WEST VISAYAS STATE UNIVERSITY in Pototan can be traced back to the post-war refresher classes under the umbrella of Iloilo High School in 1945.   The name then evolved  from Pototan Regional High School (Iloilo Branch), to Iloilo Provincial High School in 1946 and,  Pototan High School  from 1947 to 1957.

From the NARIC building where classes were originally held, it moved to a 20-room nipa building at the town plaza and finally transferred to its present site at Barangay Cau-ayan, Pototan.  Of the 11.5-hectare school site, 9.5 hectares were donated by some civic spirited Pototanons and another 2 hectares were purchased by the school..

On June 22, 1957, Pototan High School was converted to Pototan Vocational School by virtue of R.A. 1924. For 26 years, this school had been the training ground for technical-vocational education.

On June 24, 1983, it was converted into Pototan College of Arts and Sciences. Degree programs in education were added to the trade-technical courses. More buildings and classrooms were built and additional facilities were acquired.

On January 29, 1999, pursuant to Special Provision NO. 9 of R.A. 8760 Pototan College of Arts and Sciences was integrated to West Visayas State University, Iloilo City. This integration became operational on August 22, 2000, through the issuance of CHED Memorandum Order  27, s. 2000. The school is then called West Visayas State University-Pototan Campus.

As part of the university system, this campus has offered additional degree programs in line with teacher education, industrial, information, business and management technology. The present administration has introduced many changes on the physical aspects as seen in the new structures that have risen and the renovated buildings, acquired equipment and improved facilities to cater to the needs of this knowledge society.

Her existence for six decades in the community has created a niche in the field of education and training in this central part of the province.h At 60, WVSU in Pototan aspires to be the most admired external campus as it performs its role and functions as an autonomous unit in the university system whose vision is to be one of the top ten universities in Southeast Asia by 2020.

References

West Visayas State University System
Universities and colleges in Iloilo
Educational institutions established in 1945
1945 establishments in the Philippines